Aubrey William George Manning, OBE, FRSE, FRSB, (24 April 1930 – 20 October 2018) was an English zoologist and broadcaster.

Life
Manning, the son of William, who worked for the Home and Colonial Stores, and Hilda, was born in Chiswick, but moved with his family to Englefield Green in Surrey when the Second World War broke out, to escape the Blitz.

He was educated at Strode's Grammar School in Egham, at University College London, where he read zoology, and then at Merton College, Oxford, where he completed his DPhil under Niko Tinbergen.

After National Service in the Royal Artillery, he joined the University of Edinburgh as an assistant lecturer in 1956. His main research and teaching interests were on animal behaviour, development, and evolution. He was involved with environmental issues since 1966, and with the Centre for Human Ecology since its inception at the University of Edinburgh in 1970. He was Professor of Natural History at the university from 1973 to 1997. In December 1997, a gallery in the Natural History Collection of Edinburgh University was named in his honour on his retirement. He later became Emeritus Professor.

Manning died on 20 October 2018.

Honours and public offices
Manning was elected Fellow of the Royal Society of Edinburgh (1973), and received an OBE in 1998. He also held honorary doctorates from Université Paul Sabatier in Toulouse, the University of St Andrews, and the Open University. He received the Zoological Society of London Silver Medal in 2003, for public understanding of science.

Among his many posts, he was Chairman of Edinburgh Brook Advisory Centre, Chairman of the Council of the Scottish Wildlife Trust, and a trustee of the National Museums of Scotland and of Project Wallacea. He was President of the Royal Society of Wildlife Trusts from 2005 to 2010, and was Patron of Population Matters (formerly known as the Optimum Population Trust).

Writing and broadcasting
He wrote An Introduction to Animal Behaviour (1967) published by Cambridge University Press, which is now in its sixth edition (last three editions co-authored with Professor Marian Stamp Dawkins. His television broadcasts included: BBC Two's Earth Story, Landscape Mysteries and Talking Landscapes. His radio broadcasts included The Rules of Life for BBC Radio 4 and the Open University in 2006. He also broadcast five series of Radio 4's Unearthing Mysteries, Sounds of Life and Origins: the Human Connection.

Family
In 1959, he married zoologist Margaret Bastock (d. 1982) with whom he had two sons. In 1985, he married Joan Herrmann, a child psychotherapist, with whom he had another son.

See also
Human overpopulation

References

External links

Presenter of Seven Natural Wonders of the South
Population: Can We Begin to Talk Sensibly? (November 2011). Posted on the official YouTube channel of The University of Edinburgh
Aubrey Manning: A lifetime in conservation

1930 births
2018 deaths
Alumni of University College London
Alumni of Merton College, Oxford
Alumni of the University of Edinburgh
English biologists
English zoologists
Ethologists
Fellows of the Royal Society of Edinburgh
Academics of the University of Edinburgh
Officers of the Order of the British Empire
People educated at Strode's Grammar School
People from Chiswick
People from Englefield Green
Fellows of the Royal Society of Biology